Czechoslovakian Canadians may refer to:

Czech Canadians
Slovak Canadians